Vadaap is the term for the alternative means of transportation besides government provided means, which exists in many parts of the Maharashtra notably in Kolhapur. In this form of transportation private vehicle mostly Jeep/Trax/Rikshaw is employed to transport people from one place to another with nominal charge and comfort. Many times these vehicles are filled in with more number of people than transportation authority/law permits. There are many areas in Maharashtra where government transport i.e. ST not available, or only few ST buses available in a day. In such cases Vadaap is really helpful for people, and people rely on it more.

Transport in Maharashtra